Septifer is a genus of saltwater clams, marine bivalve molluscs in the subfamily Septiferinae of the family Mytilidae, the mussels.

Species 
The World Register of Marine Species lists the following species:
Septifer bilocularis (Linnaeus, 1758)
Septifer cumingii Récluz, 1849
Septifer excisus (Wiegmann, 1837)
 † Septifer huttoni (Cossmann, 1916) 
 † Septifer pissarroi Le Renard, 1994 
Septifer ramulosus (Viader, 1951)
Septifer rudis Dall, Bartsch & Rehder, 1938
Septifer rufolineatus (E. A. Smith, 1911)
 † Septifer serratus (Melleville, 1843) 
 † Septifer torquatus (P. Marshall, 1918) 
Septifer zeteki Hertlein & A. M. Strong, 1946
Synonyms
 Septifer australis Laseron, 1956: synonym of Septifer cumingii Récluz, 1849
 Septifer bifurcatus (Conrad, 1837): synonym of Mytilisepta bifurcata (Conrad, 1837) (unaccepted combination)
 Septifer bisculpturata Barnard, 1964: synonym of Septifer bisculpturatus Barnard, 1964: synonym of Septifer ramulosus (Viader, 1951) (incorrect grammatical agreement of specific epithet)
 Septifer bisculpturatus Barnard, 1964: synonym of Septifer ramulosus (Viader, 1951)
 Septifer bryanae (Pilsbry, 1921): synonym of Septifer cumingii Récluz, 1849
 Septifer crassus Dunker, 1853: synonym of Mytilisepta virgata (Wiegmann, 1837)
 Septifer cumingi [sic]: synonym of Septifer cumingii Récluz, 1849 (misspelling)
 Septifer forskali Dunker, 1855: synonym of Septifer cumingii Récluz, 1849
 Septifer forskalii Dunker, 1855: synonym of Septifer cumingii Récluz, 1849
 Septifer furcillata Gould, 1861: synonym of Septifer cumingii Récluz, 1849
 Septifer fuscus Récluz, 1848: synonym of Septifer excisus (Wiegmann, 1837)
 Septifer herrmannseni Dunker, 1853: synonym of Mytilisepta virgata (Wiegmann, 1837)
 Septifer keenae Nomura, 1936: synonym of Mytilisepta keenae (Nomura, 1936)
 Septifer keeni Nomura, 1936: synonym of Septifer keenae Nomura, 1936: synonym of Mytilisepta keenae (Nomura, 1936) (incorrect original spelling)
 Septifer pulcher Z.-R. Wang, 1983: synonym of Septifer cumingii Récluz, 1849
 Septifer trautwineana Tryon, 1866: synonym of Mytilopsis trautwineana (Tryon, 1866) (original combination)
 Septifer troschelii Dunker, 1853: synonym of Septifer excisus (Wiegmann, 1837)
 Septifer vaughani Dall, Bartsch & Rehder, 1938: synonym of Septifer excisus (Wiegmann, 1837)
 Septifer virgatus (Wiegmann, 1837): synonym of Mytilisepta virgata (Wiegmann, 1837)
 Septifer xishaensis Z.-R. Wang, 1983: synonym of Septifer rudis Dall, Bartsch & Rehder, 1938

References

External links
 Récluz, C. A. (1848). Description d'un nouveau genre de coquille bivalve nommé Septifère (Septifer). Revue Zoologique, par la Société Cuvierienne. 11: 275-279
 Stoliczka F. (1870-1871). The Pelecypoda, with a review of all known genera of this class, fossil and recent. [in T. Oldham, Paleontologia Indica, being figures and descriptions of the organic remains procured during the progress of the Geological Survey of India. Cretaceous Fauna of Southern India. Volume 3. Memoirs of the Geological Survey of India, Calcutta. pp. i-xxii, 1-537, pl. 1-50]

Mytilidae
Bivalve genera